The 1997–98 NHL season was the 81st regular season of the National Hockey League. The Stanley Cup champions were the Detroit Red Wings, who swept the Washington Capitals in four games.

League business
On June 25, 1997, the National Hockey League approved of four expansion franchises for Nashville, Atlanta, Columbus, and Saint Paul expanding the league to 30 teams by 2000. These franchises became the Nashville Predators in 1998, the Atlanta Thrashers in 1999, and the Columbus Blue Jackets and Minnesota Wild in 2000.

This was the first season for the Carolina Hurricanes, who were previously known as the Hartford Whalers. The Hurricanes played their home games at the Greensboro Coliseum Complex, a temporary home while awaiting the construction of their permanent home arena in Raleigh. They would remain in the Northeast Division until realignment the following season. It would be another 14 years before another NHL team would relocate.

This was the first season for Buffalo Sabres coach Lindy Ruff, who until the 2012–13 season was the longest-tenured NHL coach.

The controversial "FoxTrax" puck system was last used this season as well. In August 1998, the NHL signed a five-year, $600 million rights agreement with ABC Sports/ESPN. FOX elected not to use the system in the subsequent "lame duck" season.

This was the last season the Toronto Maple Leafs were a member of the Western Conference.

This was the last season of the four-division quasi-geographic alignment inherited from the traditional Adams/Patrick/Norris/Smythe set. The league would change the following season to a six-division, more purely geographic alignment.

For the first time since 1968–69 season, the Chicago Blackhawks missed the playoffs.

Due to the retirement of Craig MacTavish after the 1996-97 season,  this was the first season in the League's history in which there were no helmetless players.

Regular season
The all-time record for most shutouts in a season, set at 127 just a year earlier, was broken again as 160 shutouts were recorded, 13 of which were earned by Dominik Hasek, who set a League record with 11 teams shut-out. He zeroed the New York Rangers three times, and Los Angeles, Anaheim, Tampa Bay, Boston, Calgary, Washington, Montreal, Ottawa, Pittsburgh and Edmonton once each. Only two teams, the St. Louis Blues and the Detroit Red Wings, averaged more than three goals scored per game. In addition, only one player, Jaromir Jagr, reached the 100-point plateau during the regular season.

Highlights
Jari Kurri reached 600 goals in his career, finishing with 601.

The Vancouver Canucks and Mighty Ducks of Anaheim opened the season with a two-game series in Tokyo, Japan, the first time the NHL played regular games outside of North America.

Final standings
Eastern Conference

Western Conference

Playoffs

Bracket

Awards
The NHL Awards took place in Toronto, Ontario

All-Star teams

Player statistics

Scoring leaders 

Note: GP = Games Played, G = Goals, A = Assists, Pts = Points

Leading goaltenders
Regular season

Coaches

Eastern Conference
Boston Bruins: Pat Burns
Buffalo Sabres: Lindy Ruff
Carolina Hurricanes: Paul Maurice
Florida Panthers: Bryan Murray
Montreal Canadiens: Alain Vigneault
New Jersey Devils: Jacques Lemaire
New York Islanders: Rick Bowness
New York Rangers: Colin Campbell
Ottawa Senators: Jacques Martin
Philadelphia Flyers: Wayne Cashman and Roger Neilson
Pittsburgh Penguins: Kevin Constantine
Tampa Bay Lightning: Terry Crisp
Washington Capitals: Ron Wilson

Western Conference
Mighty Ducks of Anaheim: Pierre Page
Calgary Flames: Brian Sutter
Chicago Blackhawks: Craig Hartsburg
Colorado Avalanche: Marc Crawford
Dallas Stars: Ken Hitchcock
Detroit Red Wings: Scotty Bowman
Edmonton Oilers: Ron Low
Los Angeles Kings: Larry Robinson
Phoenix Coyotes: Jim Schoenfeld
San Jose Sharks: Darryl Sutter
St. Louis Blues: Joel Quenneville
Toronto Maple Leafs: Mike Murphy
Vancouver Canucks: Mike Keenan

Milestones

Debuts

The following is a list of players of note who played their first NHL game in 1997–98 (listed with their first team, asterisk(*) marks debut in playoffs):
Matt Cullen, Mighty Ducks of Anaheim
Joe Thornton, Boston Bruins
Sergei Samsonov, Boston Bruins
Derek Morris, Calgary Flames
Olli Jokinen, Los Angeles Kings
Sheldon Souray, New Jersey Devils
Zdeno Chara, New York Islanders
Marc Savard, New York Rangers
Chris Phillips, Ottawa Senators
Marian Hossa, Ottawa Senators
Daniel Briere, Phoenix Coyotes
Patrick Marleau, San Jose Sharks
Mattias Ohlund, Vancouver Canucks

Last games

The following is a list of players of note who played their last game in the NHL in 1997–98 (listed with their last team):

Brent Sutter, Chicago Blackhawks
Jari Kurri, Colorado Avalanche
Slava Fetisov, Detroit Red Wings
Kevin Lowe, Edmonton Oilers
Andy Moog, Montreal Canadiens
Pat LaFontaine, New York Rangers
Joel Otto, Philadelphia Flyers
Mike Gartner, Phoenix Coyotes
Al Iafrate, San Jose Sharks
Kelly Hrudey, San Jose Sharks
Jeff Brown, Washington Capitals
Brian Bradley, Tampa Bay Lightning
Norm Maciver, Phoenix Coyotes

Trading deadline
 Trading Deadline: March 24, 1998 
March 24, 1998: D Dave Babych traded from Vancouver to Philadelphia for Philadelphia's third round pick in 1998 Entry Draft. Vancouver also returns the conditional pick previously acquired from Philadelphia in the Mike Sillinger trade dated Feb. 5, 1998.
March 24, 1998: D Dmitri Mironov traded from Anaheim to Detroit for D Jamie Pushor and Detroit's fourth round pick in 1998 Entry Draft.
March 24, 1998: G Kirk McLean traded from Carolina to Florida for RW Ray Sheppard.
March 24, 1998: D Jeff Brown traded from Toronto to Washington for D Sylvain Cote.
March 24, 1998: RW Jason Dawe traded from Buffalo to NY Islanders for D Jason Holland and LW Paul Kruse.
March 24, 1998: D Dan McGillis and Edmonton's second round pick in 1998 Entry Draft traded from Edmonton to Philadelphia for D Janne Niinimaa.
March 24, 1998: C Mark Janssens traded from NY Islanders to Phoenix for Phoenix's ninth round pick in 1998 Entry Draft.
March 24, 1998: LW Warren Rychel and a conditional pick in 1999 Entry Draft traded from Anaheim to Colorado for C Josef Marha.
March 24, 1998: C Sean Pronger traded from Anaheim to Pittsburgh for the rights to G Patrick Lalime.
March 24, 1998: D Todd Gill traded from San Jose to St. Louis for RW Joe Murphy.
March 24, 1998: RW Andrei Nazarov and future considerations traded from San Jose to Tampa Bay for D Bryan Marchment, D David Shaw and a conditional exchange of first round picks in 1998 Entry Draft.
March 24, 1998: C Mike Eastwood traded from NY Rangers to St. Louis for C Harry York.
March 24, 1998: RW Mike Kennedy traded from Toronto to Dallas for Dallas' eighth round pick in 1998 Entry Draft.
March 24, 1998: RW Sandy McCarthy, Calgary's third round pick in 1998 Entry Draft and a fifth round pick in 1998 Entry Draft traded from Calgary to Tampa Bay for LW Jason Wiemer.
March 24, 1998: RW Todd Harvey, LW Bob Errey and a fourth round pick in 1998 Entry Draft traded from Dallas to NY Rangers for C Brian Skrudland, RW Mike Keane and a conditional pick in either the 1998 or 1999 Entry Draft.
March 24, 1998: RW Tom Fitzgerald traded from Florida to Colorado for the rights to LW Mark Parrish and Anaheim's third round pick in 1998 Entry Draft (previously acquired).
March 24, 1998: D Rich Brennan traded from San Jose to NY Rangers for G Jason Muzzatti.
March 24, 1998: D Ryan Risidore traded from Chicago to NY Rangers for RW Ryan Vandenbussche.
March 24, 1998: D Jamie Macoun traded from Toronto to Detroit for Tampa Bay's fourth round pick in 1998 Entry Draft (previously acquired)

See also
 List of Stanley Cup champions
 1997 NHL Entry Draft
 48th National Hockey League All-Star Game
 National Hockey League All-Star Game
 NHL All-Rookie Team
 Ice hockey at the 1998 Winter Olympics
 1997 in sports
 1998 in sports

References
 
 
 
 
Notes

External links
Hockey Database
NHL.com

 
1
1